Agrotis poliotis is a moth of the family Noctuidae. It is found in the Northern Territory of Queensland and Western Australia.

The larvae have been recorded as sometimes damaging crops.

External links
Australian Faunal Directory

Agrotis
Moths of Australia
Moths described in 1903